No More Mr. Nice Guy is an instrumental album released in 1996 by American country music artist Steve Wariner. His final album for Arista Records, it comprises twelve instrumental tracks. No singles were released from it, although "The Brickyard Boogie" was nominated for Best Country Instrumental at the Grammy Awards of 1997. This song features former Pearl River member Derek George (who would later go on to found the band Williams Riley), former Boy Howdy member Jeffrey Steele, as well as Bryan White and Bryan Austin. Jimmy Olander, guitarist for Diamond Rio, is featured on the track "Hap Towne Breakdowne".

Track listing

Personnel
 Chet Atkins – electric guitar on "Big Hero, Little Hero"
 Bryan Austin – electric guitar on "The Brickyard Boogie"
 Sam Bush – mandolin on "Prelude/Practice Your Scales Somewhere Else"
 Larry Carlton – electric guitar on "The Theme"
 Béla Fleck – banjo on "Next March"
 Ron Gannaway – drums, snare drums
 Derek George – electric guitar on "The Brickyard Boogie"
 Vince Gill – electric guitar on "No More Mr. Nice Guy"
 Randy Goodrum – drum programming, keyboards, and Hammond organ on "The Theme"
 Mitch Humphries – keyboards
 David Hungate – bass guitar
 Carl Jackson – acoustic guitar on "Hap Towne Breakdown"
 Leo Kottke – acoustic guitar on "Don't Call Me Ray"
 Paul Leim – drums
 Woody Lingle – bass guitar
 Mac McAnally – acoustic guitar on "Hap Towne Breakdown"
 Mark O'Connor – fiddle on "Prelude\Practice Your Scales Somewhere Else" and "Hap Towne Breakdown"
 Jimmy Olander – electric guitar on "Hap Towne Breakdown"
 Lee Roy Parnell – slide guitar on "Guitar Talk"
 Dave Pomeroy – bass guitar
 Nolan Ryan – vocals on "No More Mr. Nice Guy"
 Richie Sambora – electric guitar on "Guitar Talk"
 Michael Severs – electric guitar
 Jeffrey Steele – bass guitar on "The Brickyard Boogie"
 Steve Wariner – acoustic guitar, electric guitar
 Bryan White – drums on "The Brickyard Boogie"

References

External links
[ No More Mr. Nice Guy] at allmusic

1996 albums
Arista Records albums
Instrumental albums
Steve Wariner albums